Robbery Under Arms is an 1882-1883 novel by Rolf Boldrewood, writing as Thomas Alexander Browne.

Robbery Under Arms may also refer to several adaptations of the novel:

Robbery Under Arms (1907 MacMahon film), an Australian film directed by Charles MacMahon
Robbery Under Arms (1907 Tait film), an Australian lost film by J and N Tait and Millard Johnson and W Gibson
Robbery Under Arms (1920 film), an Australian film directed by Kenneth Brampton
Robbery Under Arms (1957 film), a British film directed by Jack Lee
Robbery Under Arms (1985 film), an Australian film directed by Donald Crombie and Ken Hannam
Robbery Under Arms (play), an 1890 play by Alfred Dampier and Garnet Walch
Robbery Under Arms (radio adaptation), a 1950 British programme

See also 
 Robbery (disambiguation)